Gribanovo is a rural locality (a village) in Pershinskoye Rural Settlement, Kirzhachsky District, Vladimir Oblast, Russia. The population was 42 as of 2010. There are 10 streets.

Geography 
Gribanovo is located 10 km west of Kirzhach (the district's administrative centre) by road. Khrapki is the nearest rural locality.

References 

Rural localities in Kirzhachsky District